Transcendental Étude No. 9 in A-flat, "Ricordanza" is the ninth of the twelve Transcendental Études by Franz Liszt. It has wild but gentle cadenzas and demands delicate finger work. There are some areas with syncopation similar to Frédéric Chopin's Étude Op. 10, No. 3. This is a good introduction to Liszt's pianistic style.

The piece is in Rondo form, with a relatively brief recurring principle theme in between lengthy episodes.

Ferruccio Busoni referred to this piece as "a bundle of faded love letters".

The piece is quoted in the song A Dream Is a Wish Your Heart Makes from the movie Cinderella.

References

External links
 

Transcendental 09
1852 compositions
Compositions in A-flat major